Daniel Ho (born March 5, 1968) is an American musician, composer and producer specializing in innovative approaches to Slack-key guitar, ukulele, and Hawaiian music. He has recorded 18 solo albums, some of which have won or were nominated for Grammy Awards, and has produced over 50 albums.

Biography

Of Chinese heritage, Ho was born in Kaimuki on Oahu, and currently lives in Los Angeles. He attended the Grove School of Music in Los Angeles, where he studied composition before returning home to attend the University of Hawaii at Manoa. After graduation, Daniel returned to Los Angeles and formed a smooth jazz group named Kilauea.

In the late 1990s, Ho started his own record company, Daniel Ho Creations (DHC), and recorded one of his first Hawaiian music albums with slack-key guitarist George Kahumoku, Jr. He has since recorded 18 solo albums, produced over 50 albums, served as a guest lecturer at Stanford University, performed as a soloist with the Honolulu Symphony, and received four Grammy Awards for Best Hawaiian Music Album as a producer. In 2009, he won his first Grammy Award for Best Hawaiian music album as an artist rather than as the producer of a compilation album, teaming up with Tia Carrere for the album Ikena.   The DHC label has also received three Grammy nominations for Hawaiiana, He Nani, and Spirit of Hawaiian Slack Key Guitar, three Na Hoku Hanohano Awards and several nominations, including the 2009 release Aloha Pumehana by Darlene Ahuna.

In 2008 Ho appeared in and recorded several tracks for the film Forgetting Sarah Marshall, under the pseudonym the Coconutz.  He sang on three tracks that are remakes of 20th century pop hits, translated into Hawaiian, "Nothing Compares 2 U", "Everybody Hurts", and "These Boots Are Made for Walkin'".

In 2014 Ho was featured on the March/April cover of Making Music.

References

External links
 
'Ukulele tabs for Daniel Ho's songs
Daniel Ho Interview NAMM Oral History Library (2017)

Musicians from Hawaii
Guitarists from Los Angeles
Hawaiian ukulele players
1968 births
Living people
University of Hawaiʻi at Mānoa alumni
Grammy Award winners
Na Hoku Hanohano Award winners
American musicians of Chinese descent
Hawaii people of Chinese descent
20th-century American musicians
21st-century American musicians